The Corner Packing Shed, in Frogmore, South Carolina, is a historic packing house on St. Helena Island that was built in 1930. It was listed on the National Register of Historic Places in 1988.

References

National Register of Historic Places in Beaufort County, South Carolina
Industrial buildings completed in 1930
Packing houses
Buildings and structures in Beaufort County, South Carolina
Industrial buildings and structures on the National Register of Historic Places in South Carolina